Norfolk Island twice served as a penal colony, from March 1788 to February 1814, and from 1825 to 1853. During both periods the government in the Colony of New South Wales transferred convicts that had been brought to Australia on to the island.

At first the intent was to settle and develop the island. There appear to be no compilations of which vessels brought how many convicts from New South Wales to Norfolk Island, and when, during the 1788 to 1814 period. Rough seas and the absence of good landing sites made it difficult to supply and sustain the colony. By 1812 a new penal colony had been established at Hobart Town in Van Diemen's Land and it had received its first convicts from Britain. Norfolk Island no longer served any purpose and the last settlers and convicts were removed by February 1814. The last to leave left on 28 February on HM Colonial brig Kangaroo.

During the second period the penal colony was initially revived as a place of banishment for the worst convicts, those who had re-offended while in Australia. On 6 June 1825 Major Turton, along with 34 troops, six women and children, and 57 convicts, reoccupied the island. On 23 February 1827 there was the execution, in Sydney, of the ringleaders of a convict mutiny. The 66 prisoners going to the island on the brig Wellington had succeeded in overwhelming their guards, capturing the brig, and sailing her to New Zealand. There, however, they were arrested and brought back to Sydney aboard Sisters to stand trial.

Between 1828 and 1850 some dozen vessels made about 40 voyages shuttling convicts to and from the island. The first of these arrived on 8 November 1828 with 14 convicts, and the last arrived on 6 August 1850 with one. The most brought on any voyage was 106 on Louisa on 19 September 1831. The New South Wales Government State Archives & Records has a web page that lists vessels that shuttled to the Island and back. However the site explains 'these lists are not complete!' and for more details 'see the Convict Guide'. It does give the date of arrival of each voyage, and the number of convicts carried.

Then between 1840 and 1847 fourteen ships transported male convicts to Norfolk Island from the British Isles for the British Government.

1788-1807

Between 1807 and 1813 the government evacuated Norfolk Island, moving the colonists, convicts, guards, etc. to Van Diemen's Land (VDL). The vessels that carried out the evacuation were:

1840-1850

The last convicts were removed to Tasmania in May 1853.

See also
Convict ships to New South Wales
List of convict ship voyages to Western Australia

Citations

References
 
 
 
Treadgold, M.L. (1988) Bounteous Bestowal: The Economic History of Norfolk Island. (National Centre for Development Studies, Research School of Pacific Studies, Australian National University).

 
Convictism of Norfolk Island